Rhyd-y-Beillen is a hamlet in the  community of Llanarth, Ceredigion, Wales, which is 68.5 miles (110.2 km) from Cardiff and 185.1 miles (297.9 km) from London. Rhyd-y-Beillen is represented in the Senedd by Elin Jones (Plaid Cymru) and is part of the Ceredigion constituency in the House of Commons.

See also
List of localities in Wales by population

References

External links 
British Listed Building at Rhydybeillen

Villages in Ceredigion